Nezam Ahmed Hafiz (21 April 1969 – 11 September 2001) was a Guyanese-born American cricketer. Hafiz was a right-handed middle order batsman who bowled right-arm medium pace. He died in Manhattan during the September 11 attacks.

Cricket career

Having played cricket from a young age, Hafiz captained the Guyana Under-19 cricket team in the 1988 Northern Telecom Youth Tournament, a tournament with other under-19 teams from the West Indies. His first match as under-19 captain came against Trinidad and Tobago Under-19s, captained by Brian Lara. Hafiz made his first-class debut later that year for Demerara in the final of the 1988/89 Guystac Trophy against Berbice, with the match ending in a draw. His debut for Guyana against Barbados in that same seasons Red Stripe Cup. Struggling to find a regular starting place in what was a strong Guyana team of the 1980s and early 1990s, he made four further first-class appearances for Guyana, the last of which came against the Leeward Islands. In his five first-class matches for Guyana, he scored 40 runs at an average of 10.00, with a high score of 30. He made two List A appearances for his home country, with both coming in the 1988/89 Geddes Grant Shield against the Leeward Islands and the Windward Islands.

He joined his parents and two older sisters in New York in 1992, prior to his departure he donated his cricket equipment to his local cricket club in Georgetown. Following his relocation to the United States, Hafiz went on to play a single List A match for the United States national cricket team against the Leeward Islands when the United States were invited to take part in the 1998–99 Red Stripe Bowl. In his only major appearance for the United States, he was absent hurt in their batting innings. He also toured England with the United States team in 2000.

Death
Hafiz was killed in the September 11 attacks on the World Trade Center. He had been working as a financial assistant for insurance company Marsh and McLennan, whose office was on the 94th floor of Tower One.  At the time of his death he was living at South Ozone Park, Queens. His name is one of the 2,983 names inscribed  at the National September 11 Memorial & Museum at the World Trade Center site. His name can be found on Panel N-6 of the North Pool.

References

External links

Nezam Hafiz at ESPNcricinfo
Nezam Hafiz at CricketArchive
 

1969 births
2001 deaths
American Muslims
Demerara cricketers
Guyanese cricketers
American cricketers
Guyana cricketers
Guyanese emigrants to the United States
American people of Indo-Guyanese descent
American sportspeople of Guyanese descent
American sportspeople of Indian descent
Guyanese Muslims
Guyanese terrorism victims
Victims of the September 11 attacks
Terrorism deaths in New York (state)
People from East Berbice-Corentyne
People murdered in New York City
Male murder victims